Natalia Dugarnimaevna Bolotova (born 9 March 1963 in Tsagan-Oluy, Zabaykalsky Kray) is a Russian archer.

Bolotova represented Russia at the 2004 Summer Olympics.  She placed 33rd in the women's individual ranking round with a 72-arrow score of 625.  In the first round of elimination, she faced 32nd-ranked Mon Redee Sut Txi of Malaysia.  Bolotova defeated Sut Txi, winning 154-143 in the 18-arrow match to advance to the round of 32.  In that round, she faced Park Sung-hyun of Korea, losing to the 1st-ranked and eventual gold medalist archer 165-148 in the regulation 18 arrows.  Bolotova finished 30th in women's individual archery.

Bolotova was also a member of the 9th-place Russian women's archery team in the team competition.

References
sports-reference

1963 births
Living people
Russian female archers
Olympic archers of Russia
Archers at the 2000 Summer Olympics
Archers at the 2004 Summer Olympics
20th-century Russian women
21st-century Russian women